Tetrahelia is a genus of four-ciliated protists belonging to the Endohelea, a group of heterotrophic eukaryotes previously considered heliozoa. It is the only genus in the family Tetraheliidae and order Axomonadida. It is a monotypic genus, containing the sole species Tetrahelia pterbica, previously classified as Tetradimorpha.

Description
Tetrahelia are unicellular ciliates with four standard-length centrioles that are shorter than in Heliomorpha and Tetradimorpha, and axopodia generated by a globular centrosome with a distinct granular shell and a microfibrillar core. The centrioles are arranged in two pairs: each pair has two parallel centrioles, and the pairs are positioned at 30° of rotation between each other. They are linked at the base by an amorphous material that connects them to the centrosome. There are lateral dictyosomes on either side of the cell nucleus. The axopodia have several irregularly arranged microtubules and irregularly flattened extrusomes, instead of the kinetocysts seen in Heliomorpha and Tetradimorpha radiata. The cell size is larger than 60 μm, and the centrosome itself measures between 18 and 20 μm. There is a thick pseudopellicle layer beneath the cell membrane.

The life cycle of Tetrahelia contains a lazily swimming, purely flagellate stage with fully retracted axopodia.

References

Endohelean genera